Benjamin Shenkman (born September 26, 1968) is an American actor. He is known for his roles in the comedy-drama series Royal Pains and the acclaimed HBO miniseries Angels in America, which earned him both Primetime Emmy Award and Golden Globe Award nominations.

Early life and education
Shenkman was born to a Jewish family in New York City, the son of Katherine, who was an associate at a law firm, and Shepard A. Sheinkman, who worked for a consulting company. He graduated from Brown University, and obtained a Masters of Fine Arts in 1993 from New York University's Graduate Acting Program at the Tisch School of the Arts.

Career
He began his professional acting career with a small role in the 1994 film Quiz Show directed by Robert Redford and a guest-starring role on Law & Order, his first of seven appearances throughout the run of the show. He also began working in theatre, portraying Louis Ironson in Tony Kushner's play Angels in America at San Francisco's American Conservatory Theater.

While still at New York University, Shenkman played the role of Roy Cohn in a workshop production of the play.  He would reprise the role of Louis seven years after playing the role at ACT in the HBO miniseries adaptation, earning Emmy and Golden Globe nominations.  Throughout the 1990s, Shenkman combined work in off-Broadway productions in New York  with small roles in films such as Eraser (1996), The Siege (1998), π (1998), and Jesus' Son (1999), Chasing Sleep (2000), and Requiem for a Dream (2000). In 2000, Shenkman gained success in the theatre, co-starring with Mary-Louise Parker in the Manhattan Theatre Club production of Proof, for which he received a 2001 Tony nomination. After the release of HBO's Angels in America miniseries, he returned to Manhattan Theatre club in 2004 in Sight Unseen opposite Laura Linney.

As his career continued, Shenkman moved between studio films such as Must Love Dogs (2005) and Just Like Heaven (2005), and independent movies such as Then She Found Me (2008), Brief Interviews with Hideous Men (2008), and Breakfast with Scot (2008), a gay-themed film made in Canada for which the NHL notably endorsed the use of a team's logo and uniforms. In 2010, he appeared with Michael Douglas in Solitary Man and the Sundance premiere Blue Valentine.

He also acted on TV as a series regular in the 2008 Julianna Margulies legal drama Canterbury's Law on Fox, and in recurring roles on Grey's Anatomy, Burn Notice, Damages, Drop Dead Diva, and FX's Lights Out. He co-starred in the short-lived NBC sitcom The Paul Reiser Show, which was a midseason replacement for the 2010–11 television season.

In 2012, he joined USA network's Royal Pains as the recurring character Dr. Jeremiah Sacani, and was promoted to series regular the following season, the show's fifth. In the fall of 2015, the series wrapped production of its final season, which aired in the summer of 2016.  In 2015, Shenkman also was on Broadway opposite Larry David, and later Jason Alexander, in David's hit comedy Fish in the Dark, which had a sold-out six-month limited run at the Cort Theater.

Since 2016 Shenkman has played the recurring role of Ira Schirmer on the Showtime series Billions. That year also saw him as Desk Sgt. Klein in the acclaimed HBO limited series The Night Of. The following year, 2017, he was cast as a series regular in the Shondaland drama For the People, which aired for two seasons on ABC until 2019.  In 2020, in addition to Billions fifth season, he is featured in a recurring role on Season 10 of HBO's Curb Your Enthusiasm, and as defense counsel Leonard Weinglass in Aaron Sorkin's film The Trial of the Chicago 7.

Personal life
Shenkman married Lauren Greilsheimer in 2005.

Filmography

Film

Television

Awards and nominations

References

External links
 
 
 Interview with Ben Shenkman by Beth Stevens on Broadway.com

1968 births
20th-century American male actors
21st-century American male actors
American male film actors
American male stage actors
American male television actors
Brown University alumni
Jewish American male actors
Living people
Male actors from New York City
Tisch School of the Arts alumni